Suleka Mathew is a Canadian actress, best known for her lead roles on television series Claws (TNT) as Arlene Branch, Red Widow (ABC) as Dina Tomson, Men in Trees (ABC) as Sara Jackson, and Da Vinci's Inquest (CBC) as Dr. Sunita Raman for which she was nominated 3 times for best actress at the Leo Awards. Notable guest starring roles include The West Wing and Flashpoint.  Her favourite film roles include romantic comedies Touch of Pink which premiered at the Sundance Film Festival and the upcoming movie That's Amor (Netflix).

She was born in Kerala, India, raised in Vancouver, British Columbia and currently resides in Los Angeles, California.

In addition to film and television, Suleka has also done audio work, including narrating the Audie Award nominated book The Sad Truth About Happiness by Anne Giardini and The Management of Grief by Bharati Mukherjee. She was also a cast in Rohinton Mistry's A Fine Balance and Veronica Tennant's Shadow Pleasures inspired by Michael Ondaatje.

Her most recent theatre work includes starring as Phyllis in Annie Baker's Body Awareness for Mitch and Murray Productions.

Suleka has volunteered for non-profit organizations such as Habitat for Humanity, MPTF, and Performers for Literacy.

Filmography

References

External links
 

Living people
Actresses from Kerala
Indian emigrants to Canada
Actresses from Vancouver
Canadian television actresses
Canadian film actresses
Canadian people of Malayali descent
Canadian actresses of Indian descent
Canadian expatriate actresses in the United States
Year of birth missing (living people)
21st-century Canadian actresses